Laura Pritchett (born February 16, 1971) is an American writer. Pritchett is the author of five literary novels and  one book of nonfiction. Her work is rooted in the American West and has been  significantly influenced by her native Colorado. Both her fiction and   nonfiction often focus on issues of ecology,  conservation, climate change, and social justice issues. She has been awarded  the PEN USA Award for Fiction, the High Plains Literary Award, the Milkweed  National Fiction Prize, the WILLA Fiction Award, and others. She is the editor  of three anthologies, all on environmental topics, and writes regularly for  magazines.

Life
Laura Pritchett grew up on a small ranch in northern Colorado. She received her BA and MA in English at Colorado State University, and has a PhD in English with an emphasis in Contemporary American Literature and Creative Writing from Purdue University. She teaches for writing programs around the United States. Pritchett also writes for several magazines, most often about environmental issues in the American West.

Her book, Stars Go Blue, released by Counterpoint in 2014, was heavily inspired by her father's struggle with Alzheimer's disease and the impact of his disease on her extended family. The book had an enthusiastic critical reception, including starred reviews from Booklist, and Library Journal.

It won the High Plains Literary Award and was a finalist for several others.

Red Lightning was released in 2015, and traces the story of a young coyote who has been transporting individuals once they’re past the US-Mexico border. Her other novels include Sky Bridge, released from Milkweed Editions in 2005, and Hell’s Bottom, Colorado, released from the same press in 2001. This book won the PEN USA Award for Fiction and the Milkweed National Fiction Prize.

Awards
Milkweed National Fiction Prize, Hell’s Bottom, Colorado
PEN USA West Literary Award for Fiction, Hell’s Bottom, Colorado
WILLA Literary Award for Sky Bridge
Colorado Book Award, Home Land: Ranching and a West That Works (anthology)

Works

Fiction

Novels
Hell’s Bottom, Colorado Milkweed Editions. 2001. 
Sky Bridge Milkweed Editions. 2005. 
Stars Go Blue Counterpoint. 2014. 
Red Lightning Counterpoint. 2015. 
The Blue Hour Counterpoint. 2017.

Short stories
"Dry Roots," The Sun, June 1999.
"Last Bid," The Sun, March 2000.
"Under the Apple Tree,"  The Sun, August 2006.
"Painting the Constellations," The Normal School, Issue 1, 2008. Nominated for a Pushcart Prize
"The Color of the Impression," The Rocky Mountain News, November 2008. Adapted for Stories on Stage in "A Colorado Collection".
"The Sky Behind the Trees," The Pinch, Spring 2010.
"Plan B," High Desert Journal, Fall 2010.
"I Am the Devil," The Normal School, Spring 2011.
 "Imaginary Me,"  Split Infinitive, September 2013.

Nonfiction
Pulse of the River: Colorado Writers Speak for the Endangered Cache la Poudre Co-editor, contributor. Big Earth Publishing. 2007. 
Home Land: Ranching and a West that Works Co-editor, contributor. Johnson Books. 2007. 
Going Green: True Tales from Gleaners, Scavengers, and Dumpster Divers Editor, contributor. University of Oklahoma Press. 2009. 
Great Colorado Bear Stories Riverbend Publishing. 2012.

Essays 
"Resurrecting J. Thomas," High Country News, March 2006.
"Wildfire Stars," High Desert Journal, Issue 10, Fall 2009.
"The Bird at the Window," The Sun Magazine, Issue 409, January 2010.
"Little Doses of Danger," High Country News, May 2010.
"The Western Lit Blues," High Country News, September 2010.
"Drag," The Sun Magazine, November 2011.
 "Can an Old Mine be a Work of Art?" High Country News, November 2011.
"I Don’t Love My Dog," High Country News, February 2012.
"Seven Days on Playa's New Planet: Notes From the Edge of the Writing World," Poets & Writers, March/April 2012.
 "When the Fires Came for Us," Salon, July 2012.
"Sustainable Living Fair: Bridging the Gap," 5280: The Denver Magazine, September 2012. 
"An Ode to Snow," High Country News, February 2014.
"The Last Memory," Tin House, June 2014.

Interviews
"How to Beat Writer's Block," Colorado Public Radio, June 2014.
"Grafting Experiences Like Hides: A Conversation with Laura Pritchett," Fiction Writers Review, June 2014.

References

External links
Official website

1971 births
Living people
American women writers
21st-century American women